Sex, Drink and Bloodshed is a 2004 Croatian omnibus action film. The film depicts violence among football fans in Croatia on an Eternal Derby, a match between the country's two most popular football teams, Dinamo and Hajduk. It is divided into three stories: "Seks", "Piće" and "Krvoproliće" ("Sex", "Drink" and "Bloodshed" in English), directed by Boris T. Matić, Zvonimir Jurić and Antonio Nuić, respectively.

Cast
 Franjo Dijak as Njonjo (segment "Krvoproliće")
 Bogdan Diklić as Komšija (segment "Seks")
 Matko Fabeković as Dario (segment "Seks")
 Admir Glamočak as Sejo (segment "Seks")
 Hrvoje Kečkeš as Žac
 Daria Lorenci as Policewoman (segment "Piće")
 Leon Lučev as Roko Vitaljić (segment "Piće")
 Ksenija Marinković as Valerija (segment "Seks")
 Krešimir Mikić as Zlatko Šnur
 Bojan Navojec as Mario (segment "Krvoproliće")
 Leona Paraminski as Martina (segment "Krvoproliće")
  as Bad Blue Boy (the nickname for a supporter of Dinamo)
 Rakan Rushaidat as Goc (segment "Krvoproliće")
 Dražen Sivak as Policeman (segment "Piće")

Critical reception
Critics gave mostly favorable reviews of Sex, Drink and Bloodshed. Croatican film critic Dean Šoša, writing for Nacional, rated the film 4 out of 5. He said the film is "not without faults", but that it is a "very decent and suggestive work of art", calling it the "most interesting product of Croatian cinematography since  and See You."

References

External links
 

2004 films
2000s Croatian-language films
2004 action films
Croatian anthology films
Croatian action films